Poecilanthe is a genus of flowering plants in the family Fabaceae.

Species
Poecilanthe comprises the following species:

 Poecilanthe falcata (Vell.) Heringer
 Poecilanthe grandiflora Benth.

 Poecilanthe itapuana G.P.Lewis
 Poecilanthe ovalifolia Kleinhoonte
 Poecilanthe parviflora Benth.
 Poecilanthe subcordata Benth.
 Poecilanthe ulei (Harms) Arroyo & Rudd

References

Brongniartieae
Fabaceae genera
Taxonomy articles created by Polbot